Tazeh Kand (also Romanized as Tāzeh Kand; also known as Tāzeh Kand-e Panāhī) is a village in Abbas-e Gharbi Rural District, Tekmeh Dash District, Bostanabad County, East Azerbaijan Province, Iran. At the 2006 census, its population was 189, in 31 families.

References 

Populated places in Bostanabad County